USMC Sword Manual Procedures are commonly used in the Marine Corps.  Marines considered Non-commissioned Officers (NCO) as well as Staff Non-Commissioned Officers (SNCO) may find themselves having to perform "Sword Manual", which is a stationary drill.

Description
Most Marines that fall under the category of NCO or SNCO will be mandated to take a leadership course.  Part of these courses require Marines to complete multiple drills. One of those drills is Sword Manual.
NCOs
 take Corporal's Course
 take Sergeants Course
SNCOs
 take SNCO Academy
 take SNCO Academy

Sword Manual Procedures
Draw sword
Command: "Draw, sword"
On the preparatory command: "Draw"
Grip the scabbard just below the frog with the left hand. Tilt it forward to form an angle of 45 degrees with the deck. At the same time, reach across the front of the body and grasp the sword grip with the right hand; draw the sword about 10 inches  from the scabbard until the right wrist and forearm are straight and parallel to the deck. The left hand holds the scabbard  against the side.

On the command of execution : "Sword"
Draw the sword smartly, raising the right arm to its full extent, directly to the front at an angle of about 45 degrees, the sword in a straight line with the arm, true edge down; drop the left hand to the side.
Pause for one count.
Bring the false edge of the blade against the shoulder seam, blade vertical, back of the grip to the rear, and the arm nearly extended. The right thumb and forefinger embrace the lower part of the grip, with the thumb against the trouser seam, and the remaining fingers joined in a natural curl behind the end of the hilt as if holding a pen or pencil. This is the position of carry sword.
Present sword from carry or order sword
Order sword from present sword
Carry sword from order sword or present sword
Eyes right (left) from carry or order sword
Parade rest from order sword
At ease from any position of the sword
Rest from any position of the sword
Return to Attention
Return sword from carry or order sword

See also

U.S. Marine Corps swords
U.S. regulation swords

References

Bibliography
NAVMC 2691, Marine Corps Drill and Ceremonies Manual, January 1999

Swords of the United States
United States Marine Corps equipment
United States Marine Corps lore and symbols
American Civil War weapons
Ceremonial weapons